Craugastor raniformis (common name: robber frog) is a species of frog in the family Craugastoridae. It is found in Colombia and Panama.
It is a reasonably common species found in humid lowland and montane forests up to  asl. It is also common in wet pastureland. Furthermore, it is one of the dominant frogs in abandoned mixed farming areas in the coastal Pacific rainforests in Colombia. This adaptable species is not considered threatened.

Description
Craugastor raniformis is a relatively large frog with a rather pointed snout. Adult females are much larger (snout–vent length ) than males.

Behaviour and reproduction
During the day individuals are found on the forest floor concealed in leaf litter. At night they may climb to vegetation to heights of 2.5 m above ground or more. Males and juveniles climb more than the larger females. The call of males has been described as a "ha ha ha ha".

Female C. raniformis have been observed to guard their eggs. Along with other species in the genus Craugastor, C. raniformis lays terrestrial eggs that hatch directly into small froglets. Guarding probably protects eggs against predators and fungi.

References

raniformis
Amphibians of Colombia
Amphibians of Panama
Amphibians described in 1896
Taxonomy articles created by Polbot